Wei Lijie may refer to:

 Wei Lijie (table tennis) (魏力捷)
 Wei Lijie (scientist) (韦利杰)